USS Pybus (CVE-34) was initially a United States Navy . The ship was transferred to the United Kingdom for service in the Royal Navy as the  HMS Emperor (D98) as part of the Lend-Lease program of World War II. Returned to the United States following the war, the carrier was sold for scrap in 1946.

Design and description 
The Bogue class were all larger and had a greater aircraft capacity than all the preceding American built escort carriers. They were also all laid down as escort carriers and not converted merchant ships.

Armament comprised two 4"/50, 5"/38 or 5"/51 dual purpose guns in single mounts, sixteen 40 mm Bofors anti-aircraft guns in twin mounts and twenty 20 mm Oerlikon anti-aircraft cannons in single mounts. They had a maximum aircraft capacity of twenty-four aircraft which could be a mixture of Grumman Martlet, Grumman F6F Hellcat, Vought F4U Corsair or Hawker Sea Hurricane fighter aircraft and Fairey Swordfish or Grumman Avenger anti-submarine aircraft.

Construction and career 

Pybus, originally designated AVG-34, was laid down on 23 June 1942 as MC Hull No. 245 by Seattle-Tacoma Shipbuilding, Washington. Reclassified as ACV-34 on 20 August 1942, the ship was launched on 7 October 1942 and commissioned into the United States Navy on 31 May 1943 at the Puget Sound Navy Yard, Washington. Pybus was reclassified as CVE-34 on 15 July 1943 and assigned for transfer to the United Kingdom under the Lend-Lease agreement. From March to April 1945 she was attached to the 21st Aircraft Carrier Squadron.

Pybus reported for duty with the Pacific Fleet after shakedown, in a temporary status, before she decommissioned on 6 August 1943 at New York. She was accepted that day by the UK and placed in service as HMS Emperor with the pennant number D98. During her British service, she helped provide fighter cover for airstrikes on Tirpitz, served on anti-submarine detail during Operation Overlord, and helped support the invasion of Southern France (Operation Dragoon).

Following the war, Emperor was returned to the United States Navy on 12 February 1946, struck from the Naval Vessel Register on 28 March 1946, and sold 14 May to Patapsco Scrap Co., Baltimore, Maryland for scrapping.

Notes

References

External links 

 

Ships built in Seattle
Ruler-class escort carriers
1942 ships